Guo Jingxiong, known as Daxiong (born December 25, 1975), is a comic book artist, editor and publisher. Daxiong is currently one of the most successful Chinese and European comic artists. He placed first at the Shanghai Animation & Comic Competition and received top honors at the 33rd annual anniversary of Angoulême International Comics Festival.

Early life
Daxiong was born December 25, 1975, in Jilin province, China, and developed an enjoyment for illustrating at an early age.

Career

After graduating with a degree in Commercial Design from the Jilin Art Institute in China, he assumed a teaching position with his alma mater as instructor of comic and cartoon illustrations. In 1999 he created Qicartoon Studios in Jilin province where he served as the chief illustrator. In 2000 he was the winner of the Shanghai Animation & Comic Competition with his work "Chinese Ghost Stories" which received publication soon after the competition. In 2002 Qicartoon Studios earned third place in the Shanghai Animation Competition for its work "Zhuzi Baijia". In Europe, he received top honors at the 33rd annual Angoulême International Comics Festival for his work in "Demi Gods and Semi Devils" written by Chinese novelist Jin Yong, who is the best-selling Chinese author.

Since 1999, through his studio, Daxiong has published more than 100 titles which are being distributed in China, Japan, and Taiwan. He began illustrating the MouWang series, which is being published and distributed in France by Soleil Publications. In 2008 Daxiong was arrested in China because his art offended the Chinese Communist Party.

After winning top honors at the 33rd annual Angoulême International Comics Festival for his work in "Demi Gods and Semi Devils." Da Xiong was offered a contract to work with Soleil Publication on the book Muowang.

After relocating to New York City, Daxiong founded Flag Art Studios. He was the artist on the Top 10 Special #1 with Wildstorm Productions and has been announced as the artist on the graphic novella, Star Wars: Adventures: Luke Skywalker and the Treasure of the Dragonsnakes with writer Tom Taylor through Dark Horse Comics.

Daxiong is the artist for a 10-page story titled "Superman and Doctor Light in Samurai" in DC's 80 Page Giant, Justice League of America, written by Amanda Mcmurry.

In 2022 he participated in the creation of Eternal Spring, a partially animated documentary film by Jason Loftus about Falun Gong's 2002 hijacking of broadcast television stations in Changchun.

Awards 
Awards: 
GOLDEN MONKEY KING AWARD China international Cartoon and Animation Festival (2008 China)
Top honors at the 33rd annual Angoulême International Comics Festival.(2006 France)
Viewer’s Choice Award on ICON 29.(2010 US)
Best Original interactive production (2018 nominated in Academy of Canadian Cinema & television)

Notable works
Fairy Tales (Inner Mongolia Publications, 1996)
A Thousand Phrases (Inner Mongolia Publications, 1996)
10 Greatest Stories in the World (Jilin Publication, 1998)
Chinese Ghost Stories (Northern China Publications, 2000)
Philosophers (Jilin Entertainment, 2001)
Water Margin Heroes (Shanghai People's Press, 2002)
Twenty Years of Strange 12 Issues (Hebei Art Press, 2002)
36 Tactics, 18 issues (Northern Press, 2003)
Sir Apropos of Nothing #4 Alt Cover (IDW, 2008)
TOP 10 Special #1 (Wildstorm Productions, 2009)
Justice League of America 80-PAGE Giant 10-page Superman story, (DC Comics, 2009)
Star Wars Adventures: Luke Skywalker and the Treasure of the Dragonsnakes (January 20, 2010)
Fringe: Tales From The Fringe #2" (July, 2010)
Star Wars Adventures: Boba Fett and the Ship of Fear (2011)
La Guerre des Orcs T1  (Soleil France 2011)
GFT GRIMM FAIRY TALES #104 C (Zenescope Entertainment 2013)
Wonderland #27 Cover (Zenescope Entertainment 2014)
#117 Wicked Cover A- [Zenescope Comic 2015]
CBRNe World Magazine Cover (2015 Oct edition)
Red Whisperer (self- publish)
Shuyan saga video game (Art Director, Mark Media Canada, released in August 2017)

References

External links

Chinese comics artists
Comic book editors
Comic book publishers (people)
1975 births
Living people
Artists from Jilin
Falun Gong practitioners